

Ancient Greece

Poets (by date of birth)
 Anacreon (c. 570–c.485 BCE), Teos
 Xenophanes of Colophon (c. 570–c.478 BCE)
 Phocylides (b. c. 560 BCE)
 Simonides of Ceos (c. 556–469 BCE)
 Hipponax of Ephesus (fl. 540 BCE)
 Aeschylus (525–456 BCE)
 Pindar (c. 522/518 in Cynoscephalae – 443 BCE in Argos)
 Bacchylides (b. c. 507 BCE)

Dates unknown:
 Ibycus, flourished in Rhegium
 Aesop
 Theognis of Megara
 Corinna

Works
Ode to Polycrates

Middle East

Poets
 Jeremiah of Anathoth, writing in Hebrew

Works
 Psalms 
 Book of Jeremiah 
 Book of Lamentations

China

Poets (by date of birth)

Works

India

Poets
 Approximate date of Vyasa

Works
 Approximate date of the Mahabharata

References

Poetry by century
Poetry